Parkway Drive: The DVD is a documentary film about the Australian metalcore group, Parkway Drive. It was released on 22 September 2009. It is centered on the formation and beginnings of the band, their record label signings and how they managed to continuously tour from country to country with little time in between. The DVD went platinum in Australia and earned numerous awards in their home country.

Content

The DVD
 In the Beginning
 Coming Together
 First Show
 Making Progress
 The Truth
 KWAS
 Uncharted Waters
 Other Side of the World
 The Chode
 (Ten) Things Get Ugly
 Only the Best Hotels
 California Dreamin
 On the Road U$A
 Epitaph
 Ups and Downs
 Horizons
 The New Europe
 Around the World
 Sweatfest
 A Different Point of View
 12/12/08
 Home Sweet Home
 Rolling Dice

Live Set
 "Boneyards"
 "Gimme A D"
 "Idols and Anchors"
 "Carrion"
 "Guns for Show, Knives for a Pro"
 "The Sirens' Song"
 "Mutiny"
 "Feed Them to the Pigs"
 "Dead Man's Chest"
 "Smoke 'Em If Ya Got 'Em"
 "Romance Is Dead"

Bonus Content
Bonus footage

Awards
The film won the award of Best Byron Film at the 2010 Byron Bay International Film Festival.

Certifications

References

2009 films
2009 albums
Parkway Drive albums
Documentary films about heavy metal music and musicians
Australian documentary films

it:Wikipedia